Fontaine-sur-Somme (literally Fontaine on Somme) is a commune in the Somme department in Hauts-de-France in northern France.

Geography

Main sights
 The church at Fontaine-sur-Somme
 The church at Vieulaines
 Stone cross
 The lakes
 War memorial

See also
Communes of the Somme department

References

Communes of Somme (department)